Ángel López Ramón (born 17 February 2003) is a Spanish footballer who plays as a defender for Deportivo Aragón.

Club career
Born in Zaragoza, Aragon, López represented Real Zaragoza as a youth. He made his senior debut with the reserves on 18 October 2020, starting in a 1–1 Tercera División away draw against CF Illueca.

López made his first-team debut on 1 December 2021, starting in a 1–0 away win over CD Mensajero in the season's Copa del Rey. His professional debut occurred 13 days later, as he started in a 2–0 home win against Burgos CF, also in the national cup.

References

External links

2003 births
Living people
Footballers from Zaragoza
Spanish footballers
Association football defenders
Segunda División players
Tercera División players
Tercera Federación players
Real Zaragoza B players
Real Zaragoza players
Spain youth international footballers